is a railway station operated by Kyushu Railway Company (JR Kyushu) in Takeo, Saga, Japan. It is operated by JR Kyushu and is served by the Nishi Kyushu Shinkansen and the Sasebo Line.

Lines
The Nishi Kyushu Shinkansen to and from  also terminates here.

Station layout 
The station building consists of two side platforms serving two elevated tracks. The station complex has entrances north and south of the tracks and is a modern structure completed in 2009. The Nishi Kyushu Shinkansen has an island platform and a side platform serving three elevated tracks. Platform 10 serves as the cross interchange platform for the limited express Relay Kamome for direct connections to the Shinkansen on Platform 11. However, Track 12 is not in use until the approval for the extension towards Hakata has been made. Facilities include a staff ticket window with a Midori no Madoguchi facility, a waiting room, a cafe, shops and the Takeo Tourist Information Centre. Parking for cars is provided under the elevated structure and car rentals are available.

Platforms

History
In the next phase of expansion, the track was extended westwards with Takeo-Onsen opening as the new western terminus on 5 May 1895 with the name Takeo. When the Kyushu Railway was nationalized on 1 July 1907, Japanese Government Railways (JGR) took over control of the station. On 1 December 1934, another route was given the designation Nagasaki Main Line and the track serving Takeo was designated the Sasebo Line. On 19 June 1975, the station was renamed Takeo-Onsen. With the privatization of Japanese National Railways (JNR), the successor of JGR, on 1 April 1987, control of the station passed to JR Kyushu.

Work to elevate the station commenced in Fiscal 1997. The south entrance of the station and the elevation of platforms 2 and 3 were completed in February 2008. The north entrance and the addition of one more platform (platform 1) was completed the following year and the ceremony to mark the completion of the elevation project was held on 5 December 2009.

Takeo-Onsen Station is a terminus of the Nishi Kyushu Shinkansen. On 26 March 2008, Minister of Land, Infrastructure, Transport and Tourism of Japan granted permission for the start of construction. The Shinkansen platforms are to the south of the existing station. Platform 10 on the conventional line will serve as a direct transfer for passengers on the Shinkansen traveling to Hakata on the Relay Kamome until the completion of the route to Hakata. The line opened on 23 September 2022.

Passenger statistics
In fiscal 2016, the station was used by an average of 1,728 passengers daily (boarding passengers only), and it ranked 106th among the busiest stations of JR Kyushu.

See also
 List of railway stations in Japan

References

External links
Takeo-Onsen Station (JR Kyushu)

Railway stations in Japan opened in 1895
Railway stations in Saga Prefecture